The 2015 Norwegian Football Cup Final took place at Ullevaal Stadion in Oslo on November 22, 2015. Rosenborg were in their 16th final (9 wins and 6 runners-up) with a chance to win a Double, after they won a Tippeligaen, while Sarpsborg 08 were in their first final ever and had the chance to win the first trophy in the club's history.

Route to the final

(TL) = Tippeligaen team
(D1) = 1. divisjon team
(D2) = 2. divisjon team
(D3) = 3. divisjon team
(D4) = 4. divisjon team

Match

Details

See also
2015 Norwegian Football Cup
2015 Tippeligaen
2015 1. divisjon
2015 in Norwegian football

References

External links 
 Cup final at altomfotball.no

2015
Rosenborg BK matches
Sarpsborg 08 FF matches
Football Cup
Sports competitions in Oslo
November 2015 sports events in Europe
2010s in Oslo
Final